Wilton Township is a township in Muscatine County, Iowa, in the United States.

History
Wilton Township was organized in 1853. It was first settled in 1849.

References

Townships in Muscatine County, Iowa
Townships in Iowa
1853 establishments in Iowa